The Wilds may refer to:

 The Wilds (Johannesburg), a municipal nature reserve and park in Johannesburg, South Africa
 The Wilds (Ohio), a safari park in Ohio, USA
 The Wilds (TV series), a US streaming television show